In mass transfer, the sieving coefficient is a measure of equilibration between the concentrations of two mass transfer streams.  It is defined as the mean pre- and post-contact concentration of the mass receiving stream divided by the pre- and post-contact concentration of the mass donating stream.

where
 S is the sieving coefficient
 Cr is the mean concentration mass receiving stream
 Cd is the mean concentration mass donating stream

A sieving coefficient of unity implies that the concentrations of the receiving and donating stream equilibrate, i.e. the out-flow concentrations (post-mass transfer) of the mass donating and receiving stream are equal to one another.  Systems with sieving coefficient that are greater than one require an external energy source, as they would otherwise violate the laws of thermodynamics.  

Sieving coefficients less than one represent a mass transfer process where the concentrations have not equilibrated.  

Contact time between mass streams is important in consider in mass transfer and affects the sieving coefficient.

In kidney
In renal physiology, the glomerular sieving coefficient (GSC) can be expressed as:
sieving coefficient = clearance / ultrafiltration rate

See also
Heat exchanger
Condenser pinch point
Sieve

References

Transport phenomena
Chemical engineering
Mechanical engineering